The World Festival of Black Arts (French: Festival Mondial des Arts Nègres), also known as FESMAN, is a month-long culture and arts festival that takes place in Africa. The festival features poetry, sculpture, painting, music, cinema, theatre, fashion, architecture, design and dance from artists and performers from around the African Diaspora.

History
The festivals were planned as Pan-African celebrations, and ranged in content from debate to performance — particularly dance and theatre.

Dakar, 1966

The First World Festival of Black Arts or World Festival of Negro Arts was held in Dakar, Senegal, 1–24 April 1966, initiated by former President Leopold Senghor, under the auspices of UNESCO, with the participation of 45 African, European, Caribbean, and North and South American countries, and featuring black literature, music, theater, visual arts, film and dance. It was first state-sponsored festival to showcase the work of African and African diasporic artists, musicians and writers to a global audience.

Participants included historian Cheikh Anta Diop; dancers Arthur Mitchell and Alvin Ailey; Mestre Pastinha, a Capoeira troupe from Bahia; Duke Ellington; Marion Williams; singers Julie Akofa Akoussah and Bella Bellow; calypsonian The Mighty Terror; writers Aimé Césaire, Langston Hughes, Wole Soyinka, Amiri Baraka, and Sarah Webster Fabio. The filmmaker William Greaves made a 40-minute documentary of the event entitled The First World Festival of Negro Arts (1968). Italian journalist Sergio Borelli produced Il Festival de Dakar (1966) a 50-minute documentary for RAI. Directors from the USSR Irina Venzher and Leonid Makhnach produced the Russian-language documentary Ритми Африки (Ritmi Afriki) about the festival.

Lagos, 1977

In 1977, from 15 January to 12 February, the Second World Festival of Black Arts or Black and African Festival of Arts and Culture — known as FESTAC '77 — took place in Lagos, Nigeria, under the patronage of President Olusegun Obasanjo. Attended by more than 17,000 participants from over 50 countries, it was the largest cultural event ever held on the African continent. Among artists who took part were Stevie Wonder, the Sun Ra Arkestra, and Donald Byrd from the US, Tabu Ley and Franco from the Congo, Gilberto Gil from Brazil, Bembeya Jazz National from Guinea, and Louis Moholo, Dudu Pukwana, and Miriam Makeba from South Africa.

Dakar, 2010
The 2010 World Festival of Black Arts took place 10–31 December 2010, and was initiated by Senegalese President Abdoulaye Wade with the theme of African Renaissance. President Wade said in his 2009 address at the UN: "I call all Africans, all the sons and daughters of the Diaspora, all my fellow citizens, all the partners that are ready to walk by our side, all States, all international organizations, foundations, firms, etc. for a shining success for this Festival, and for the rise of a new Africa." It was curated by Kwame Kwei-Armah, and participants at the opening ceremony included Youssou N'Dour, Baaba Maal, Angélique Kidjo, Toumani Diabaté, Wyclef Jean, Euzhan Palcy, Carlinhos Brown and the Mahotella Queens. As well as music and cinema, the festival featured art exhibitions, theatre and dance performances, fashion shows, photography and other events, with the participation of artists and intellectuals from dozens of African and African diaspora countries, including the US, Brazil, Haiti, France and Cuba.

References

Further reading

External links
 Facebook site for the 2009 festival
 US FESMAN Committee
 "Black World Festival", Funnelme.
 "Festac 77 - Lagos Festival", UNESCO.
 "Festival mondial des arts nègres"- "World Festival of Black Arts" by Sergio Borelli, 50 min. Report made for television of the Dakar Arts Festival of 1966. Featuring Senghor, Duke Ellington and Langston Hughes.

1996 establishments in Senegal
African festivals
African film festivals
Art exhibitions in Senegal
Art festivals in Africa
Arts festivals in Africa
Arts festivals in Nigeria
Arts organisations based in Senegal
Arts organizations based in Africa
Arts organizations based in Nigeria
Arts organizations established in 1996